Death Records is a San Francisco-based Lo-Fi/Outsider Pop record label. Founded by Brian Wakefield & Colin Arlen in 2014, the label was created to "Represent the 'misfits of this city' who have been left behind to fend for themselves". The label has started an annual festival, Deathstock, to celebrate the labels "birthday". Acts such as Gary Wilson, Tomorrow's Tulips & The Memories played the inaugural year.

The label mainly showcases SF/Bay Area based artists. After the trends of many garage rockers moving to Los Angeles, Wakefield did the opposite of most & moved back to S.F after a short stint in L.A. to start this label, as well as working on projects Melted Toys & Emotional.

It was announced on October 28, 2017, that Death Records was no longer in operation.

References

Record labels based in California
Record labels established in 2014
2014 establishments in California
Pop record labels
Music of the San Francisco Bay Area
Defunct record labels of the United States